Empoli Football Club, commonly referred to as Empoli, is an Italian football club based in Empoli, Metropolitan City of Florence. Founded in 1920, the side is part of a select group of Italian football clubs that do not belong to a provincial capital city that have participated in the top-flight.

Empoli has spent most of its history in professional football. In Europe, the best results obtained was participation in the 2007–08 UEFA Cup.

History

From the 1920s to the 1970s
In August 1920, Foot Ball Club Empoli and the football section Unione Sportiva Empoli were born. After the participation of a tournament in San Miniato, the two merged into a single local football club. The next season, the new club, after having obtained in September affiliation in the Italian Football Federation (FIGC) ratified by the Tuscan Regional Committee, was included in Group A of the Tuscan Promozione 1921–22, but did take part due to economic problems, choosing instead to join the league of Terza Categoria, where the team achieved second place in the group A.

In the 1922–23 season, Empoli finished in second place in Group A of the Terza Categoria, gaining admission to the final round after winning the play-off in Florence, held on 15 April 1923 against Pontedera, 1–0. The season concluded with a third place in the group final.

The following three seasons, from 1923 to 1926, Empoli continued to play in the Tuscan third division. Then, in the 1926–27 season, Empoli won the Group A division of Tuscany, and was admitted to the interregional finals; thanks to a fourth place in Group G, the Tuscans were promoted in the North Division of the Second Division 1927–28, the third Italian football tier of the era. In the following season the team was then inserted in Group C of the North Division, which concluded in fourth place, but for economic reasons refused the invitation to take part in the next championship of Prima Divisione, and therefore followed the downgrading of the Seconda Divisione from third to fourth tier. However, already the following season, in the 1928–29 Seconda Divisione, the club won promotion, winning the Tuscan championship, and returned to the North Division of Prima Divisione.

Empoli was in the Prima Divisione, then Serie C, until the 1935–36 season, when the team withdrawn halfway through the season because of the call to arms for many of its players. Empoli resumed competitive activity from Prima Divisione the next season, under the name of OND Empoli, with the colours gray and blue; the team won the Tuscan Group A again gaining admission in Serie C. Until the shutdown from the causes of war, Empoli played in Serie C, obtaining a best result of sixth place in 1938–39. Meanwhile, the club was renamed OND Interaziendale Italo Gambaccioni Section Soccer from 1938 to 1941, until the name was changed again to Associazione Calcio Empol.  On 15 September 1935, Empoli debuted in the Coppa Italia with a 1–0 home success against Pontedera.

After World War II, Empoli took up the club name of Empoli Foot Ball Club after being called Sports Group Azelio Landi for a brief period between October and November 1944, and was admitted into Serie B thanks to a third-place finish in the 1945–46 season. In Serie B, Empoli played for four consecutive seasons, finishing in third place in the 1946–47 season. Relegation of the club – which by then had adopted the colour blue – occurred at the end of 1949–50 championship. The permanence in Serie C lasted for six seasons: in the summer of 1955, the club sold most of its players and at the end of the 1955–56 season, the Tuscan side were relegated to Serie D. After three seasons in the fourth division, in 1959–60 the Azzurri risked relegation to the regional level after finishing in 15th place, on equal points with Carrarese and Rieti. The club managed to escape relegation before drawing with Carrarese and then surpassing Lazio, in Pesaro, with a goal from Vezzosi. In 1960–61, Empoli returned to the third tier of Italian football, but for only one season, again suffering relegation.

The club returned to Serie C on 9 June 1963 after beating Tempio 2–0 in the play-off in Genoa. The club's permanence in the third tier of Italian football, then called Serie C1, lasted for 20 years until the 1982–83 season.

The 1980s and 1990s
In 1986, the small-town club was promoted to Serie A. Playing their first few home games in Florence, Empoli's Serie A debut resulted in a 1–0 win over Internazionale. Helped by a nine-point deduction from Udinese, they avoided relegation with 23 points and 13 goals in 30 games. Empoli themselves received a five-point penalty the following season, and were relegated despite an improved showing. They were relegated again to Serie C1 in 1989.

This club then spent several seasons in Serie C1 before returning to Serie B in 1996 and achieving a second successive promotion in 1997. With Luciano Spalletti at the helm, Empoli defied the odds to finish in 12th place and avoid relegation. Relegation the following year began a three-year stay in Serie B, in which time the club became renowned for nurturing its own outstanding young talent.

Promotions to Serie A in 2002 and 2005 have seen the club emerge as battlers against relegation. They ended the 2005–06 season in tenth place in the top-flight. As a result of the Serie A match-fixing scandal at the end of that season, they gained qualification for the UEFA Cup for the following season, however they did not play in it because the club management failed to apply for a UEFA license. In the 2006–07 season, the club once again qualified for the UEFA Cup.

The years 2000 and participation in the UEFA Cup
With the prospect of European football approaching, the management strengthened the squad, most notably signing a number of young players from large Serie A clubs, such as Rincón of Inter, Ignazio Abate and Lino Marzoratti of Milan and Sebastian Giovinco, Claudio Marchisio and Rej Volpato of Juventus on loan or co-ownership deals. Empoli marked their debut in the UEFA Cup with a two-legged match against Zürich, losing 4–2 on aggregate. A poor showing in the initial part of the season then led chairman Fabrizio Corsi to sack Luigi Cagni, who led the Tuscans to UEFA Cup qualification, and replace him with Alberto Malesani. However, the club's fortunes did not change and Malesani was sacked after a 2–0 defeat to Sampdoria which left them at the bottom of the table. Cagni was re-appointed on 31 March 2008 but the team suffered a last-minute relegation. Cagni resigned and was replaced by Silvio Baldini ahead of the 2008–09 season. Baldini's tenure, however, did not prove to be successful, as the Tuscans ended the season only in fifth place, and were later defeated in the promotion playoffs by Brescia.

Between Serie B and Serie A
Despite modest results, Baldini was sacked. By December 2011, the club had gone through four coaches since the 2009–10 season. The club maintained their Serie B status dramatically in 2011–12. After a poor season, Empoli finished 18th, one point from safety, which meant a relegation play-off against Vicenza over two legs. The first game finished goalless before Vicenza led 2–0 in the second leg with 30 minutes to go. However, two goals in two minutes saw the Azzuri level the tie before Massimo Maccarone secured a 3–2 victory in the fourth minute of injury time. 2012–13 saw the club finish fourth, a dramatic improvement on the previous season, but lost the promotion play-off final to Livorno over two legs. The club secured promotion back to Serie A the following season, finishing as runners-up to Palermo and stayed in the top flight for two seasons, finishing 15th in 2014–15 and 10th in 2015–16. Going into the final matchday of the 2016–17 Serie A season, Empoli were one point above the relegation zone ahead of Crotone, however were eventually relegated to Serie B after they failed to beat Palermo, while Crotone beat Lazio. After a triumph of the 2017–18 Serie B, Empoli promptly regained promotion to Serie A, after winning Serie B on 28 April 2018, four matches in advance. In the final matchday of the 2018–19 Serie A season, Empoli were one point above the relegation zone ahead of Genoa, however were eventually relegated to Serie B after they were defeated by Internazionale, while Genoa drew with Fiorentina, both sides finished on the same number of points but Genoa had a greater goal difference by one. However, Empoli finished first in the 2020–21 Serie B season, to be their third title in the competition in their history.

Players

Current squad

Primavera

Out on loan

Coaching staff

Notable former players
Players with international caps, appearances in Olympic Games or 100 league appearances with Empoli

  Elseid Hysaj
  Mark Bresciano
  Vince Grella
  Emílson Cribari
  Jorge Vargas
  Igor Budan
  Ignazio Abate
  Daniele Adani
  Marco Borriello
  Raoul Bortoletto
  Luca Bucci
  Antonio Buscè
  Andrea Coda
  Dario Dainelli (youth)
  Antonio Di Natale
  Éder
  Sebastian Giovinco
  Massimo Maccarone
  Claudio Marchisio
  Vincenzo Montella
  Andrea Raggi
  Tommaso Rocchi
  Luca Saudati
  Luciano Spalletti
  Francesco Tavano
  Luca Toni
  Ighli Vannucchi
  Piotr Zieliński
  Samuel Mráz
  Zlatko Dedić
  Johnny Ekström
  Marcelo Zalayeta

 See also: :Category:Empoli F.C. players

Former managers
See .

 Antonio Vojak (1937–39)
 Enrico Colombari (1939–40)
 Sergio Cervato (1968–70)
 Sergio Castelletti (1971–72)
 Renzo Ulivieri (1972–76)
 Bruno Giorgi (1976–77)
 Vincenzo Guerini (1983–85)
 Luigi Simoni (1988–89)
 Vincenzo Montefusco (1989–91)
 Francesco Guidolin (1991–92)
 Adriano Lombardi (1993–94)
 Luciano Spalletti (1995–98)
 Luigi Delneri (1998)
 Mauro Sandreani (1998–99)
 Corrado Orrico (1998–99)
 Elio Gustinetti (1999–00)
 Silvio Baldini (1999–03)
 Mario Somma (2004–06)
 Luigi Cagni (2006–07)
 Alberto Malesani (2007–08)
 Luigi Cagni (2008)
 Silvio Baldini (2008–09)
 Salvatore Campilongo (2009–10)
 Alfredo Aglietti (2010–11)
 Giuseppe Pillon (2011)
 Guido Carboni (2011–12)
 Alfredo Aglietti (2012)
 Maurizio Sarri (2012–15)
 Marco Giampaolo (2015–16)
 Giovanni Martusciello (2016–2017)
 Vincenzo Vivarini (2017)
 Aurelio Andreazzoli (2017–2018)
 Giuseppe Iachini (2018–2019)
 Aurelio Andreazzoli (2019)
 Cristian Bucchi (2019)
 Roberto Muzzi (2019–2020)
 Alessio Dionisi (2020–2021)
 Aurelio Andreazzoli (2021-2022)
 Paolo Zanetti (2022-present)

In Europe

UEFA Cup

Honours 
Serie B
 Winners: 2004–05, 2017–18, 2020–21
Serie C1
 Winners:  1928–1929, 1982–1983,
Coppa Italia Serie C
 Winners: 1995–96

Divisional movements

References

External links

Empoli's official website

 
Football clubs in Tuscany
Association football clubs established in 1920
Serie A clubs
Serie B clubs
Serie C clubs
Serie D clubs
Empoli
1920 establishments in Italy